Mick Ebeling (born November 14, 1973) is an American inventor, entrepreneur, author, speaker and philanthropist who focuses on developing groundbreaking technology that benefits humanity. Ebeling is the recipient of the Muhammad Ali Humanitarian of the Year Award and was named as one of the “Top 50 Most Creative People” by Fortune Magazine, a WIRED Agent of Change, 2x SXSW Innovation Award winner, a 2x Tribeca Disruptor Award winner, and the only person to receive TIME Magazine’s Top Invention of the Year 2 times  - for the Eyewriter in 2010 and Bento in 2021.

Ebeling is the founder and CEO of Not Impossible Labs, social tech incubator whose stated mission is to “create technology for the sake of humanity.”  To date, 3 companies have been spun off from the incubator:  Bento, Music:Not Impossible, and Vibrohealth. Ebeling is also founded the nonprofit organization The Not Impossible Foundation.

Not Impossible Labs 
Mick Ebeling has stated that he has “made it his life mission to make the impossible not impossible” and so, in 2011, he founded Not Impossible Labs, a tech incubator and think tank whose philosophy revolves around identifying absurdities and developing solutions designed to end these absurdities with technology.  The company’s projects tend to cater to a central character and solve their problem, following the belief that if you find out how to help one person, you can help many with the same solution. Not Impossible Labs’ first project, and also the impetus for its foundation, was the EyeWriter.

In April 2009, Ebeling flew five programmers and hackers from Graffiti Research Lab, Free Art and Technology Lab, and openFrameworks to Los Angeles and in the living room of his home created the EyeWriter, an open source, DIY device which enables individuals with paralysis to communicate and create art using only the movement of their eyes. 

The EyeWriter project was conceptualized and first created for Tempt One, a Los Angeles-based graffiti artist who was diagnosed with Amyotrophic lateral sclerosis (ALS) in 2003. Tempt One wrote his first piece of graffiti after seven years using the EyeWriter on April 10, 2009. Ebeling's March 2011 TED talk: The invention that unlocked the locked-in artist discusses the creation of The EyeWriter and Ebeling's mission to raise public awareness and inspire ideas that encourage change. With no technical background in ocular recognition technology, Ebeling asks the question: “If not now, then when? If not me, then who?”  

TIME magazine called it one of the “50 Best Inventions of 2010,” and the device is now part of the permanent collection of New York’s Museum of Modern Art (MoMA). Ebeling is also the executive producer of the documentary film "Getting Up: The Tempt One Story", winner of the Audience Award at the 2011 Slamdance Film Festival.

Ebeling heard the story of Daniel, a boy from South Sudan who lost both arms during an explosion and, upon waking up, declared that he’d rather be dead than not have arms so that he’d be less of a burden for his family. Project Daniel was then born and, after extensive research, Not Impossible Labs managed to create a 3d-printable prosthetic arm. In November 2013, Ebeling flew to South Sudan and set up what’s likely one of the country’s first 3d-printing prosthetic labs.  Of the project, TIME's tech journalist Harry McCracken wrote, "it’s hard to imagine any other device here doing more to make the world a better place.” Project Daniel has won numerous accolades, including a 2015 SXSW Interactive Innovation Award, as well as being nominated for “Design of the Year” from London’s Design Museum. In 2014, it garnered the Titanium Cannes Lion as well as Gold and Bronze Lions. Project Daniel also won Association of Independent Commercial Producers’ Next Cause Marketing Award, Best in Show in the 2014 One Show, Silver and Bronze Telly Awards, and the 2014 Maker Faire Editor's Choice Blue Ribbon. Project Daniel has been featured in Time, WIRED, Business Insider, Yahoo! Finance, BBC, The Guardian, Globo, The Independent, and CNET.

Since The EyeWriter and Project Daniel, Not Impossible Labs continues to focus on solving absurdities with technology. With Music: Not Impossible, the team created wearable technology that allows those who are deaf or hard of hearing to experience music through vibrations spread around their body. Hunger: Not Impossible, now called Bento, is a simple text-based technology that connects those who suffer from food insecurity to pre-paid meals. The initiative was thought of as a response to the COVID crisis, and has become Not Impossible Labs’ response to ending food insecurity.

Ebeling's first book, Not Impossible: The Art and Joy of Doing What Couldn't Be Done, was released by Simon & Schuster on January 6, 2015 and documents his work with Not Impossible Labs, focusing on the EyeWriter and Project Daniel.

Early career
Ebeling's first entertainment job was launching Venice Beach based, FUEL in 1995.  FUEL was a motion design studio using one of the first versions of the Adobe After Effects software.  FUEL was bought by Razorfish in July 1999. Ebeling then went on to be the CEO of THEY. THEY was a cross-platform design company that worked with clients such as NASA.  In 2001, Mick formed The Ebeling Group (TEG), a commercial and film production company that focuses on animation, design and visual effects.

From 2006 to 2011, under Ebeling's leadership the company branched into film and long form content with credits on titles such as “Stranger Than Fiction” (2006), “Kite Runner” (2007), “Quantum of Solace” (2008), the award-winning animation "Yes, Virginia" television special for CBS (2009) and a series of short films with Marvel Studios called "One-Shots" (2011).

Ebeling is also the executive producer of the documentary film "Getting Up: The Tempt One Story", winner of the Audience Award at the 2011 Slamdance Film Festival.

In 2014, Ebeling will be featured as one of Intel's Innovators for their "Look Inside" Series. Other sponsored Innovators include Jack Andraka.

Ebeling's first book, Not Impossible: The Art and Joy of Doing What Couldn't Be Done, discusses his work on the Eyewriter and Project Daniel and was released by Simon & Schuster on January 6, 2015. The Book is now in its fifth printing.

Personal life and education 
Mick Ebeling was raised in a family of entrepreneurs and philanthropists, son of Marge and Les Ebeling. He was born in Long Beach, California and raised in Phoenix, Arizona where he attended Brophy College Preparatory. He went on to play basketball for the Air Force Academy, Colorado before he transferred to University of California, Santa Barbara where he graduated in 1992 with a degree in political science. Mick is married to Caskey Ebeling, an American filmmaker and screenwriter; they have three children: Angus, Bo Jameson, and Trace. Caskey is a partner of The Ebeling Group and co-founder of The Not Impossible Foundation.

Awards and press

Wins 
 Muhammad Ali Center Humanitarian of the Year
 Fortune World’s 50 Greatest Leaders
 TIME Magazine 2021 Top Inventions of the Year
 TIME Magazine 2010 Top Inventions of the Year
 Wired Magazine’s Agents of Change
 2017 Tribeca’s Disruptive Innovation Awards Christensen Prize
 2019 Tribeca Disruptor Award
 Curators Recognition and Next Cause Awards, from the Association of Independent Commercial Producers
 No Barriers’ Summit Innovation Award
 Burke Award Honoree, from Burke Rehabilitation Center
 USA Network Top Ten Cultural Trailblazer
 iMedia Top 25 Marketing Leaders & Innovators
 Advertising Age Creativity 50: Most Creative People
 Gold Edison Award - Social Innovation

 AICP (2010) The Next Awards Product Integration for Macy's "Yes, Virginia"
 SKIP of New York Ruby Slipper Award
 Cannes Lions Film Craft Silver Award for Macy's "Yes, Virginia"
 Cannes Lions Titanium and Integrated Bronze Award for Macy's "Yes, Virginia"
 Cannes Lions Titanium Lion for Project Daniel sponsored by Precipart and Intel
 Cannes Lions Gold Lion in the Product Design category for Project Daniel sponsored by Precipart and Intel
 Cannes Lions Bronze Lion in the Cyber  category for Intel’s “Look Inside™: Mick Ebeling” campaign
 Cannes Lions Bronze Lion in the Film category for Intel’s “Look Inside™: Mick Ebeling” campaign
 Cannes Lions Bronze Lion in the Branded Content & Entertainment category for Project Daniel, sponsored by Intel and Precipart
 One Show Entertainment Gold Pencil Award for Macy's "Yes, Virginia"
 One Show Silver Pencil Award for Macy's "Yes, Virginia"
 One Show Branded Content Single Silver Award for Macy's "Yes, Virginia"
 Telly Award Silver Award for Social Responsibility for Project Daniel
 Telly Award Bronze Award for Documentary for Project Daniel

Nominations
 Grammy Award (2009) for Best Short Form Music Video for “Another Way to Die” by Jack White and Alicia Keys

References

External links 
 
 The Ebeling Group
 The Not Impossible Foundation Founder webpage
 
 Not Impossible Book
 
 Mick Ebeling: The invention that unlocked a locked-in artist (TEDActive 2011)
 TEDxKids: Mick Ebeling (TEDxSMU 2011)
 Mick Ebeling: EyeWriter Needs You (TEDxDU 2011)

American nonprofit chief executives
American film producers
Living people
1973 births